Upper McNulty Reservoir is a reservoir in the U.S. state of Oregon, located slightly to the northwest of McNulty Reservoir, in Malheur County.

See also
List of lakes in Oregon

References

Lakes of Malheur County, Oregon
Reservoirs in Oregon